Luden's is an American brand of cough drop that is currently manufactured and sold in the US by Prestige Consumer Healthcare. Company headquarters are in Tarrytown, New York. Luden's products include Blue Raspberry, Honey Lemon, Honey Licorice, Kiwi-Strawberry, Orange, Original Menthol, Sugar-Free Wild Cherry, Watermelon, Wild Berry, Wild Cherry, and Wild Honey cough drops.

History
William H. Luden created the Luden's brand in 1879.  Early products included cough drops and candy.  Luden gave samples of his cough drops to railroad workers, giving the product national exposure in an early example of guerrilla marketing.

Luden's  was acquired in 1928 by Food Industries of Philadelphia, a holding company owned by the Dietrich family. During its heyday under Dietrich ownership, Luden's produced more than 500 varieties of candy in addition to its better-known cough drops and employed more than 1,200 people. In 1967 filmmaker Ed Seeman hired musician Frank Zappa to collaborate on a Luden's television commercial. Zappa's music was matched with Seeman's animation and the advertisement won a Clio award for "Best Use of Sound". In 1980 the company acquired Queen Anne Candy Co., based in Hammond, Indiana. 

The Dietrich family sold Luden's Inc. to Hershey Foods Corp in 1986, resulting in the termination of 98 salaried and 350 hourly workers. Luden's Throat Drops brand was sold by Hershey's to Pharmacia in 2001. In 2003, Pharmacia was acquired by Pfizer. In 2006, Pfizer sold its consumer products division, including the Luden's line, to Johnson & Johnson.

As of 2008, packages of Luden's throat drops displayed the slogan "Trusted Luden's Care – Everyone needs a little TLC".

In November 2009 Charlesbank Capital Partners/Blacksmith Brands announced that it had completed its acquisition of Luden's over-the-counter consumer products brands from McNeil-PPC, Inc.

In late 2010, Prestige Brands acquired Blacksmith Brands.

Ingredients
Luden's brand throat drops are demulcents (meaning a swelling or irritation reliever) and mild oral anesthetics. The active ingredient in fruit flavors is pectin, a soluble gelatinous polysaccharide found in ripe fruits.  Pectin places a coating on the throat to reduce irritation and swelling.  Original Menthol and the various Honey flavors contain menthol, an oral anesthetic and irritant reliever.

The drops' inactive ingredients include FD&C blue No. 1, FD&C blue 2, FD&C red 40, ascorbic acid, citric acid, malic acid, sodium acetate, sodium chloride, caramel color, corn syrup, flavors, soybean oil used as a processing aid, sucrose, and water.

References

External links
 Official website

1879 introductions
Throat lozenges
Demulcents
Prestige Brands brands